These are the official results of the Women's 400 metres event at the 1983 IAAF World Championships in Helsinki, Finland. There were a total number of 35 participating athletes, with five qualifying heats and the final held on Wednesday 10 August 1983.

Jarmila Kratochvílová in lane 3 spent much of the race chasing Mariya Kulchunova-Pinigina to her outside, while Taťána Kocembová quickly made up the stagger on Rosalyn Bryant between the two Czech teammates.  Kratochvílová finally made up the stagger on Pinigina in the middle of the final turn and came onto the home stretch barely two metres up on the Soviet and a metre up on her teammate.  She widened that to four metres by the finish and Kocembová opened up a similar gap on Pinigina.

Each of the top four competitors in this race set their lifetime best, Kratochvílová only being beaten once with 1985's still standing world record 47.60 by Marita Koch.  In addition to Kratochvílová remaining the #2 performer in history, Kocembová is #5, Pinigina is #15.  Almost forgotten is #56 Gaby Bußmann, still under 50 seconds.

Medalists

Records
Existing records at the start of the event.

Final

Semifinals
Held on Tuesday 9 August 1983

Quarterfinals
Held on Mopnday 8 August 1983

Qualifying heats
Held on Sunday 7 August 1983

References
 Results

 
400 metres at the World Athletics Championships
1983 in women's athletics